Śmieszkowo may refer to the following places:
Śmieszkowo, Greater Poland Voivodeship (west-central Poland)
Śmieszkowo, Lubusz Voivodeship (west Poland)
Śmieszkowo, West Pomeranian Voivodeship (north-west Poland)